James Carnes may refer to:

James E. Carnes, American politician; served in Ohio State Senate from 1995 to 2004
James Jewett Carnes (1899–1986), American military leader; Governor of Free Territory of Trieste in 1947
James J. Carnes, American Navy, chief electrician's mate, namesake of Carnes Crag
Jimmy Carnes (1934–2011), American track and field athlete, coach and administrator
James V. Carnes, American rock singer

See also
James Carne (1906–1986), English recipient of the Victoria Cross